Cornelio T. Villareal (September 11, 1904 – December 22, 1992) was a Filipino politician who served as Speaker of the House of Representatives of the Philippines from 1962 to 1967, and again from 1971 to 1972. Popularly known as Kune, his congressional career representing the Second District of Capiz spanned six decades.

Early life

Villareal was born in Mambusao, Capiz. He finished his intermediate and secondary education in Capiz, and enrolled at the Silliman University for his pre-law course. In 1929, he received his law degree from the Philippine Law School and passed the bar exams on December 07, 1929.

Political career

Villareal's political career began in 1934, when he was elected as a delegate to the 1935 Constitutional Convention. In 1941, Villareal won his first election as a Member of the House of Representatives, representing the Second District of Capiz. His term was interrupted by the Japanese invasion in late 1941, but he reassumed his seat in 1945 He was re-elected in 1946 under the banner of the Liberal Party, and served continuously until 1972. In 1951, Villareal unsuccessfully sought election to the Philippine Senate, for the seat vacated by Fernando Lopez upon the latter's election as Vice-President.

Villareal was first elected Speaker of the House of Representatives during the 5th Congress, in March 1962. During the 6th Congress, he was unseated as speaker in 1967 by Jose Laurel, Jr. of the Nacionalista Party. Villareal regained the Speakership from Laurel, Jr. during the 7th Congress in 1971, and served in that capacity until Congress was abolished upon the declaration of martial law by President then dictator Ferdinand Marcos Sr.  in September 1972.

Villareal withdrew from politics until Congress was restored following the ouster of Marcos. At age 83, he was again elected to his congressional seat in the Second District of Capiz in 1987. He was the oldest member of the 8th Congress, while his colleague from Capiz, Gerardo "Dinggoy" Roxas, Jr., was the youngest member of Congress. Ironically, Roxas would outlive Villareal only by a few months.

Villareal did not seek re-election following the expiration of his term in June 1992.

Death
He died six months later, aged 88.

During his congressional career, Villareal advocated liberal economic and trade policies such as decontrol and decentralization.

References
 

|-

|-

|-

|-

Notes

1904 births
1992 deaths
People from Capiz
Speakers of the House of Representatives of the Philippines
Members of the House of Representatives of the Philippines from Capiz
Silliman University alumni
Liberal Party (Philippines) politicians
20th-century Filipino lawyers
Minority leaders of the House of Representatives of the Philippines
Philippine Law School alumni
Presidents of the Liberal Party of the Philippines
Visayan people